The British University Ladies' Gaelic Football Championship is the ladies' Gaelic football Championship for university sides in Britain.

Organisation
It is run by the British Universities GAA on behalf of Ladies' Gaelic Football Association Normally played across venues in Birmingham and Manchester. The last few years have seen Division 1 played in Pairc na hEireann and Division 2 and 3 played in various venues around Manchester.

Between 2001 and 2009, the Ladies Division 1 Championship winners would enter the Lynch Cup - the Division 3 championship for universities in Ireland - at the semi final stage. During these years, St Mary's University, Twickenham made the Lynch Cup final twice in 2002 and 2005 losing to Mary Immaculate College, Limerick and Trinity College, Dublin  while Liverpool Hope University made the Lynch Cup final 3 years in a row, 2005-8, losing to Dublin City University, Dundalk Institute of Technology and University College Cork.

Currently Liverpool Hope University are champions for 2018, beating cross city rivals Liverpool John Moore University in the final.

Championship Winners

Roll of Honour

 11 - St Mary's University, Twickenham
 5 - Liverpool Hope University
 3 - Robert Gordon University
 1 - Queen Margaret University

References

External links
 Website

Gaelic football competitions in the United Kingdom
Gaelic football
Women's sports competitions in the United Kingdom
Ladies' Gaelic football competitions